Umid Isoqov (born 22 December 1978) is an Uzbek former professional footballer.

Career
Isoqov played for most of his playing career for Neftchi Farg'ona and won the Uzbek League in 2001. He played 215 matches for Neftchi, scoring 141 goals. In 2001 Isoqov won the Uzbekistan championship with Neftchi and finished runners-up in the Uzbek Cup. He scored 28 goals and became League Topscorer. He was Neftchi's best goalscorer in the League for five seasons, three seasons of them in a row 1999-2001. Isoqov is the second best goalscorer in the club's history in League matches after Anvar Berdiev.

International
He made his debut in the national team on 29 February 2000 in a match against Mongolia, ended with an 8:1 victory. He played 8 matches and scored 3 goals.

Career statistics

International goals

Honours

Club
 Uzbek League (1): 2001
 Uzbek League runner-up (7): 1997, 1998, 1999, 2000, 2002, 2003, 2004
 Uzbek Cup runner-up (4): 1997, 1998, 2001, 2002

Individual
 Uzbekistan Footballer of the Year  3rd: 2001
 Uzbek League Top Scorer (2): 1999, 2001
 Gennadi Krasnitsky club: 188 goals

References

External links

Umid Isoqov player info 

1978 births
Living people
Uzbekistani footballers
Uzbekistan international footballers
Association football forwards
FK Dinamo Samarqand players
FK Neftchi Farg'ona players